The Deutsches Literaturarchiv Marbach (DLA – German Literature Archive), established in 1955, in Marbach am Neckar, is one of the most significant literary archives in the world. Its collections span literary and intellectual history from 1750 to the present and are open to everyone who is conducting source criticism. The DLA offers nearly 800,000 volumes and over 1,000 journals.

References

External links
 

Literary archives in Germany
German literature